Ujir is a language spoken on the Aru Islands of eastern Indonesia, spoken in the villages of Ujir and Samang in northwestern Aru. , it is highly endangered, since it is only spoken by a small fraction of the population of the two villages.

References

Aru languages
Languages of Indonesia
Endangered Austronesian languages